The 1989 NCAA Division II Men's Soccer Championship was the 18th annual tournament held by the NCAA to determine the top men's Division II college soccer program in the United States.

New Hampshire College defeated UNC Greensboro in the final, 3–1, to win their first Division II national title. The Penmen (22-1-2) were coached by John Rootes.

The final match was played on December 3 in Greensboro, North Carolina.

Bracket

Final

See also  
 NCAA Division I Men's Soccer Championship
 NCAA Division III Men's Soccer Championship
 NAIA Men's Soccer Championship

References 

NCAA Division II Men's Soccer Championship
NCAA Division II Men's Soccer Championship
NCAA Division II Men's Soccer Championship
NCAA Division II Men's Soccer Championship